"Thunder" is a song by Italian DJs Gabry Ponte and Prezioso (a member of dance trio Prezioso & Marvin) and Austrian DJ Lumix. It was released as a single on 7 May 2021 via Spinnin' Records. The song reached the top 10 in Belgium, the Netherlands, Norway and Sweden.

Composition
According to a press release, the song contains "dramatic percussion and uptempo female vocals" and "the beat is dropped in characteristic triplet style". It is written in the key of B♭ minor, with a tempo of 135 beats per minute.

Track listing

Credits and personnel
Credits adapted from Tidal.

 Andrea Di Gregorio – producer, writer
 Cristiano Cesario – producer, writer
 Gabry Ponte – producer, writer, programmer
 Lumix – producer, programmer
 Marco Quisisana – producer, writer
 Prezioso – producer, writer, programmer
 Daniele Mattiuzzi – mastering, mixer
 Shibui – vocals
 Alessandro Hueber – writer
 Fatin Shady Cherkaoui – writer
 Lorenzo Ohler – writer

Charts

Weekly charts

Year-end charts

Certifications

References

2021 songs
2021 singles
Gabry Ponte songs
Spinnin' Records singles